{{DISPLAYTITLE:C25H27NO2}}
The molecular formula C25H27NO2 (molar mass: 373.486 g/mol) may refer to:

 D-161
 Endoxifen

References

Molecular formulas